William Howard Wilcock (21 December 1904 – 12 September 1999) was the first Governor of the Central Bank of Malaysia.

Honours 

 Honorary Commander of the Order of the Defender of the Realm (P.M.N. (K)) - Tan Sri (1961)

References 

1904 births
1999 deaths
Australian bankers
Governors of the Central Bank of Malaysia
Honorary Commanders of the Order of the Defender of the Realm